Geffert may refer to:
 12747 Michageffert, a main-belt asteroid, named after Michael Geffert
 17855 Geffert, a main-belt asteroid, named after Martin Geffert
 Johannes Geffert (born 1951), a German organist
 Martin Geffert (1922–2015) a German amateurvgggyeyyeueyeueuei astronomer
 Michael Geffert (born 1953), a German astronomer and discoverer of minor planets
 Viliam Geffert (born 1955), a Slovak theoretical computer scientist